Arthur Matthews (1889–?) played for the New Zealand rugby league team in 1919 on their tour of Australia. He was Kiwi number 117. He played in 3 tour matches but did not play in any tests as there were none played on this tour. He lived in Auckland and played for the Ponsonby United and North Shore Albions senior teams from 1915 to 1920.

Personal life
He was born on June 28, 1889. The son of Louisa and Charles Matthews. He had several siblings. They were Clara Louisa (b.1879), Florence Sarah (b.1881), Charles Bosley (b.1883), NR (b.1885), Eric William (b.1899), and May Elizabeth (b.1892). It appears that he later moved to Australia and died in Western Australia in 1951.

Playing career
Arthur Matthews began his career playing for Ponsonby United in the Auckland Rugby League competition. He played for them in the 1915 and 1916 seasons. He was an electrician by trade and in 1917 he volunteered for the war effort on March 16 while he was living in Thames. After being physically examined he was declared fit for active duty though he never went away to fight.

He was involved in some controversy early in the 1917 season. He and his brother (W Matthews) turned out for the North Shore Albions without having formalised a transfer. Grafton Athletic protested and the Auckland Rugby League stood down both players and stated that the match should be replayed. It was later reported that it was an oversight as W Matthews had just returned from war service and had played some matches for Ponsonby 3rd grade team years earlier, while the Ponsonby 3rd grade team had withdrawn from the competition due to a lack of playing numbers. As a result, the Ponsonby club had granted both brothers transfers. The transfers were duly processed allowing Arthur Matthews to turn out for North Shore in their second round match against City Rovers.

In 1918 North Shore were forced to withdraw from the senior competition due to a lack of playing numbers. Many sports were struggling at this time because so many of their players had gone away to fight in the First World War. As a result, Matthews transferred back to the Ponsonby club where he played for the remainder of the season. He played for them in their Thacker Shield winning effort where they beat Sydenham in Christchurch 11–0 and scored a try
. In 1919 the North Shore team was revived and he returned to them. This was to be the most impressive season of Matthews career.

In May 1919 he played in a trial match to make the New Zealand team. The match was played at Victoria Park and he was listed in the centres. Subsequently, he was selected for the New Zealand team on their 1919 tour of Australia. He was named in the reserves to play for New Zealand in a warm up match against Auckland but did not take the field.
Matthews played in 3 of the 11 tour matches, being used in 3 different positions. He debuted for New Zealand against Tamworth on June 11, playing in the centres. New Zealand won the match 21–13. His next match was against Ipswich Firsts on June 26 where he played fullback in an 11–8 win. He kicked a goal and this was to be his only points for New Zealand. His third match was against Rockhampton on July 9. This time he was to play in the halfback position and this was to be the last game he would play for New Zealand. New Zealand would also win this match 23–0.

Unusually Matthews did not represent Auckland until after he had played for New Zealand. Partly this was due to the fact that so few Auckland representative matches were played in previous seasons due to the war. He played for the “Rest of Auckland” team against the touring side on their return. Auckland was to lose 30–45 in front of 6,500 spectators at Victoria Park. This was to be the only time he pulled on the Auckland jersey.

In 1920 he again turned out for the North Shore team but at the end of the season on 8 September he was granted an open transfer by the Auckland Rugby League to play for any club outside the Auckland league district in their weekly meeting. It is unknown as to where he was moving to or if he played again.

References

New Zealand rugby league players
New Zealand national rugby league team players
Auckland rugby league team players
Ponsonby Ponies players
North Shore Albions players
1889 births
Year of death missing
Rugby league fullbacks
Rugby league centres
Rugby league halfbacks